James Douglas (1867–1940) was a British critic, newspaper editor and author.

Douglas edited The Star from 1908 to 1920, then the Sunday Express until 1931.  He was a supporter of censorship, and called for several books to be banned, most notably The Well of Loneliness.  He was mocked by P. R. Stephensen and Jack Lindsay in The Sink of Solitude (1928).

References

External links
 
 

1867 births
1940 deaths
British newspaper editors
British writers
British critics